Events from the year 1844 in Russia

Incumbents
 Monarch – Nicholas I

Events

Births

 Marija Mesjtjerskaja, courtier  (d. 1868)
 Varvara Rudneva, physician (d. 1899)
 April 1 – Nikolai Skrydlov, admiral (d. 1918)

Deaths

 Roksandra Skarlatovna Edling, courtier  (d. 1786)
Carl Eberhard von Trinius born in MDCCLXXVII in Elsleben,Saxony.

References

1844 in Russia
Years of the 19th century in the Russian Empire